The Puerto Rico fiscal agent and financing (Spanish: Agente Fiscal y Financiamiento de Puerto Rico) are a group of government-owned corporations of Puerto Rico that manage all aspects of financing for the executive branch of the government of Puerto Rico. These report to the Secretariat of Governance and the Chief of Staff, and do not constitute an agency by themselves but are referred as such in official documents, transcripts, expositions, and conversations.

Agencies

 Municipal Financing Agency
 Authority for the Financing of Housing
 Authority for the Financing of Industrial, Touristic, Educative, Medical, and Environmental Control Facilities (AFICA)
 Authority for the Financing of Puerto Rico Infrastructure
 Public-Private Partnerships Authority
 Public Financing Corporation
 Economic Development Bank
 Government Development Bank
 Urgent Interest Fund Corporation (COFINA)

References

Revenue services
Office of the Governor of Puerto Rico
Government-owned corporations of Puerto Rico
Government finances in Puerto Rico